Skedvi/Säter Ishockeyförening (abbreviated Skedvi/Säter IF) is a Swedish ice hockey club based in the small town of Säter in southern Dalarna.  The club was created in 2001 as a merger of Säters IF and Skedvi.

After being promoted from Division 2 in 2013, the club plays in group C of Division 1, the third tier of ice hockey in Sweden, .

Season-by-season

External links
 Official website
 Profile on Eliteprospects.com

Ice hockey teams in Sweden
Ice hockey teams in Dalarna County